Michael Bzdel, C.Ss.R. (July 21, 1930 – April 3, 2012) was a Ukrainian Catholic Archbishop, serving as the Metropolitan of the Ukrainian Catholic Archeparchy of Winnipeg, Canada.

Bzdel was born to Ukrainian immigrants in Wishart, Saskatchewan, Canada, on July 21, 1930, the 11th of 14 children in his family. He studied at the Redemptorist-run Saint Vladimir's College in Roblin, Manitoba, Canada, and decided to become a priest.

In 1984 Bzdel was elected Provincial Superior of the Yorkton, Saskatchewan, Canada Province of the Redemptorist Order, a position he held until his elevation to the episcopate in 1992.

As Metropolitan, Archbishop Bzdel was one of the four ex-officio members of the Permanent Council of the Canadian Conference of Catholic Bishops.

In 1997, Pope John Paul II named him a Delegate to the Synod of Bishops for America.
  
He retired in January 2006, after nearly 13 years as Metropolitan.

Notes

External links

1930 births
Canadian people of Ukrainian descent
2012 deaths
Bishops of the Ukrainian Greek Catholic Church in Canada
Redemptorist bishops
Archbishops of the Ukrainian Greek Catholic Church
Eastern Catholic archeparchs in North America
People from Rural Municipality Emerald No. 277, Saskatchewan